Lucas Sánchez may refer to:

 Lucas Sánchez (footballer, born 1992), Argentine defender
 Lucas Sánchez (footballer, born 1994), Argentine midfielder
 Lucas Sánchez (footballer, born 1997), Argentine defender